FL Technics is a global provider of aircraft maintenance, repair and overhaul (MRO) services, headquartered in Vilnius, Lithuania. The company has Base Maintenance facilities in Lithuania, Indonesia and China and provides Line Maintenance support across Europe, Africa, Asia-Pacific, and the CIS states.

An EASA Part-145, Part-M, Part-147, Part-21, FAA-145 (Indonesia) certified company, FL Technics serves a wide range of Boeing, Airbus, ATR, Embraer and other types of aircraft.

FL Technics is a part of Avia Solutions Group, which is led by Jonas Janukenas, CEO, and Gediminas Ziemelis, Chairman of the Board. Zilvinas Lapinskas is the CEO of FL Technics.

History

2005

The company was founded in Lithuania and opened its first hangar at the Vilnius International Airport.

2007

The company added a second hangar at the Vilnius International Airport. Since then FL Technics occupies 2 aircraft maintenance hangars, a warehouse, and backshop facilities at the Vilnius International Airport – 13 742 sq. meters in total. The hangars consist of five airframe maintenance bays.

2009
In May, the company signed a contract with the Slovak airline Seagle Air for periodic maintenance of Boeing 737 aircraft.

In July, the company signed a strategic partnership agreement with a Costa Rican aircraft maintenance company to provide FL Technics services on their technical basis for the overhaul of Boeing 757-200 long-haul aircraft.

In October, the company signed contracts with Air Italy and Air Slovakia for the maintenance of the Boeing 737-300 aircraft base.

At the end of the year, the company was renamed FL Technics.

2010

In February, FL Technics acquired the Boeing 737-300 glider from GE Capital Aviation Services (GECAS).

In June, FL Technics expanded its PART-145 maintenance capabilities with basic Boeing 737-600/700/800/900 maintenance services.

In August, the company expanded its maintenance training capabilities with ATR 42-200/300 and ATR 72-100/200 theoretical training services. In the same month, FL Technics purchased a second Boeing 737-300 fuselage for disassembly.

In December, FL Technics added the Airbus A318 / A319 / A320 / A321 to its PART-M feature list.

By the end of the year, FL Technics began operating nine line stations — three in Kazakhstan, two in Tajikistan, and the remaining four located in UK, Italy, Russia, and Vilnius.

2011

In February, FL Technics serviced the first Airbus A320 aircraft. The Airbus A320 family of aircraft has been supplemented by FL Technics' EASA Part-145 certificate. The certification was conducted by the Lithuanian Civil Aviation Authority.

In June, FLT Technics received Part-M certification to support the airworthiness of the Embraer EMB-135/145 family of aircraft.

In July, FL Technics began providing comprehensive fixed-line line technical support to Wizz Air combined with additional support services. In the same month, FL Technics purchased 7 Boeing 737-300 aircraft from AirAsia for disassembly into parts and components. The plane was disassembled in Malaysia. This acquisition allowed FL Technics to increase its level of service while maintaining a wider range of spare parts and components.

In August, FL Technics received a certificate for engineering services for the Bombardier CL600-2B19. In the same month, FL Technics launched cabin modification and reconfiguration services on two new Boeing 737-800 long-haul aircraft and cabin repair services on the Boeing 737-300 for Transaero.

In September, FL Technics acquired the UK-based Storm Aviation Limited. The acquired company allowed FL Technics to begin performing Line Maintenance services for narrow body and wide body aircraft in a network of 24 Line Stations across Europe and the CIS and expanded FL Technics aircraft capabilities into Airbus A330, Airbus A340, Airbus A380, Boeing 747, Boeing 767, Boeing 777 and other types of aircraft. In September, FL Technics also expanded its partnership with Europe Airpost to provide 3 aircraft maintenance services. Boeing 737 Cl.

2012

In May, FL Technics became a sales representative for the UK parts distributor Aero Inventory in Eastern Europe and the Commonwealth of Independent States (CIS).

2022 
In February, FL Technics received two extensions within current Part-145 approval for providing line maintenance services for Boeing B787 aircraft, and for borescope inspections of Pratt & Whitney PW1100G-JM series engines.

In April, the company opened an aircraft wheel and brake maintenance shop at Hanover International Airport, Germany.

In October, FL Technics unified its acquired companies and continued operation under a single brand.

Facilities 
 Vilnius (Lithuania): 4 narrow-body a/c, over 13 742 sq.m. hangar and workshop space
 Kaunas (Lithuania): 5 narrow-body a/c, 8000 sq.m. hangar and workshop space
 Jakarta (Indonesia): 3 narrow-body a/c, over 20 000 sq.m. hangar and workshop space
 London Stansted (United Kingdom) through subsidiary company Storm Aviation: 4 narrow-body a/c, over 8700 sq.m. hangar space
Prestwick (United Kingdom) through subsidiary Chevron Technical Services: 3 wide-body a/c, 6000 sq.m. hangar space
 Harbin (China) through subsidery company FL ARI: 4 narrow-body a/c, over 15 000 sq.m. hangar and workshop space

Acquisitions

Flash Line Maintenance S.r.l., Italy
Storm Aviation, London, United Kingdom
FL ARI, Harbin, China
Wright International, Canada
Chevron Technical Services, United Kingdom

Awards 
In 2013, FL Technics was named one of the most valuable companies for Lithuania and its citizens.

In 2019, FL Technics received The Asian MRO of the year award.

In 2019, FL Technics ranked No. 4 in the top 10 energy/industry companies in Lithuania.

References

External links 

Aviation companies
Lithuanian companies established in 2005
Companies of Lithuania